Hightown may refer to:


Places

United Kingdom
 Hightown, Hampshire
 Hightown, Merseyside
 Hightown, West Yorkshire
 Hightown, Belfast, in UK Parliament constituency Belfast North
 Hightown, County Antrim, a townland in County Antrim, Northern Ireland
 Hightown, Wrexham, a place in Wrexham County Borough, Wales

United States
 Hightown, Virginia, an unincorporated village in Highland County

Other uses
 Hightown (TV series), American crime drama television series
 Hightown, a wealthy precinct in the fictional city-island of Madripoor in X-Men

See also
 
High Town (disambiguation)